Carpophorus is a name of Greek origin that means "fruit-bearer." It can refer to:

People 
A bishop of the Archdiocese of Carthage who presided from 258?
The owner of Pope Callixtus I when the latter was still a slave
The priest who converted Chrysanthus of the sainted pair Chrysanthus and Daria
Carpoforo Tencalla (1623–1685), Swiss-Italian Baroque painter
Carpophorus, a Roman slave who fought animals in the Inaugural games of the Flavian Amphitheatre

Places 
San Carpóforo Canyon, California
San Carpoforo, church in Gabiano, Italy
San Carpoforo, church in Como, Italy

Saints 
Carpophorus, Exanthus, Cassius, Severinus, Secundus, and Licinius (died ca. 295), Christian soldiers martyred at Como
Rufus and Carpophorus (Carpone), martyrs of Capua 
Carpophorus is one of the Four Crowned Martyrs
Carpophorus, priest martyred around 300 either at Spoleto or at Seville

Other 
Carpophorus was an epithet of Demeter and her daughter Persephone